Daryl Lewis Washington (born October 9, 1986) is a former American football linebacker. He played college football for Texas Christian University (TCU), and was drafted by the Arizona Cardinals in the second round of the 2010 NFL Draft. In May 2014, he was suspended indefinitely by the league for violating its substance abuse policies and was not reinstated until April 2017, where he was released by the Cardinals shortly after.

High school career
Washington attended Irving High School in Irving, Texas. He was named all-district defensive player of the year after he totaled 168 tackles with four sacks as a senior. He was selected to play in the Texas-Oklahoma Oil Bowl All-Star Game.

College career
Washington attended Texas Christian University, where he played for the TCU Horned Frogs football team from 2006 to 2009.  As a true freshman in 2006, he contributed at linebacker and on special teams. He recorded 16 tackles for the season (14 solo). In his sophomore year, he blocked a nation-best three punts, while also registering 32 tackles for the season (25 solo).

Although still primarily a back-up and special teams player, Washington was TCU's fourth-leading tackler with 63 stops in 2008. He started the 2008 Poinsettia Bowl and posted six tackles and three pass breakups in TCU's victory over Boise State.  He started at middle linebacker in 2009 and established himself as one of the leaders TCU's defense, which was one of the best in the nation. He was named one of 12 semifinalists for the 2009 Butkus Award.  He earned first-team All-MWC and All-American selections.

Professional career
At the conclusion of the pre-draft process, Washington was projected to be a second round pick by Sports Illustrated. He was ranked as the fourth best outside linebacker available in the draft by Sports Illustrated and was ranked the fifth best outside linebacker by DraftScout.com. 

The Arizona Cardinals selected Washington in the second round (47th overall) of the 2010 NFL Draft.

In 2010, Washington had 78 tackles, one sack, one forced fumble, and one interception that he fumbled.

Having started at inside linebacker since his rookie-season in 2010, Washington emerged to become among the best linebackers in NFL, being named to the 2012 All-Pro Team as well as being selected to participate in the 2013 Pro Bowl as an alternate for the NFC roster.

Washington agreed to a six-year contract extension on September 6, 2012.

Washington was suspended by the NFL in May 2014 before being conditionally reinstated on April 25, 2017. On May 11, 2017, the Arizona Cardinals officially released Washington after he refused to take a pay cut. On July 5, 2017, it was reported that the Dallas Cowboys were interested in possibly signing Washington.

NFL statistics

Controversies

NFL suspensions
On April 3, 2013, the NFL announced that Washington would be suspended for the first four games of the  season for violating the league's substance policy. On May 30, 2014, Washington was suspended indefinitely for violating the league's substance policy again. He was conditionally reinstated on April 25, 2017, but was released by the Cardinals a month later.

Assault
On May 3, 2013, Washington was arrested in Phoenix, Arizona on two counts of aggravated assault (and one count of criminal trespass in the first-degree) from an incident on May 1, 2013 involving his 27-year-old ex-girlfriend with whom he shares a daughter. The altercation concerned a custody dispute over the 5-month-old child. Phoenix Police accused him of pushing her with two hands, causing her to fall and break her right collarbone. On March 24, 2014, he pleaded guilty to the crime of aggravated assault, a class 6 felony. Washington was sentenced to one-year of supervised probation on April 23, 2014.

References

External links
TCU Horned Frogs bio 
Arizona Cardinals bio

1986 births
Living people
People from Irving, Texas
Players of American football from Texas
Sportspeople from the Dallas–Fort Worth metroplex
American football linebackers
TCU Horned Frogs football players
Arizona Cardinals players
National Conference Pro Bowl players